William Aubrey (1759–1827) was a Welsh engineer who designed and built steam-powered machines, including his work as superintendent at the Tredegar iron works and 40-year employment by Samuel Homfray. At the Aberdare Ironworks and Penydarren Ironworks, he was a consulting engineer.

He worked on development of the Cyfarthfa works, the Europe's largest water system of its kind, with Watkin George. He died 22 July 1827.

References 

1759 births
1827 deaths
Welsh engineers
18th-century British engineers
19th-century British engineers